The 2009 Trail Appliances Autumn Gold Curling Classic was held October 9–12 at the Calgary Curling Club in Calgary, Alberta. It was the first Grand Slam event of the 2009-10 Women's World Curling Tour.

The total purse of the event is $56,000 and the winning team received $14,000.

Jennifer Jones and her Winnipeg, Manitoba rink won their second title, and fifth Grand Slam title. They defeated the Chinese national team in the final. The Chinese team was the first non-Canadian team to make it to a Grand Slam final in any event, men'ts or women's.

Teams

Results

A Event

B Event

C Event

Playoffs

Autumn Gold Curling Classic
2009 in Canadian curling
2009 in women's curling